Neha Dhupia (born 27 August 1980) is an Indian actress and model.

Early life
Dhupia was born in (present-day Kochi), India to a Punjabi Sikh family. Her father, Commander Pradip Singh Dhupia, served in the Indian Navy and mother, Manpinder, (Babli Dhupia) is a homemaker. She went to Naval Public School, Cochin then transferred to Navy Children School, Chanakyapuri, New Delhi. She graduated from Jesus and Mary College in New Delhi,  affiliated to the University of Delhi, with honours in History.

Career

Dhupia made her acting debut in a play in New Delhi called Graffiti. Thereafter she appeared in a music video for Indipop band Euphoria and modeled for advertisement campaigns.

She then appeared in the TV serial Rajdhani. In 2002, she participated in the Femina Miss India pageant, where she was crowned as Miss India 2002. She was subsequently sent to the Miss Universe 2002 pageant in Puerto Rico where she placed in the top 10. After placing in the pageant, Dhupia intended to pursue a career in the Indian Foreign Service, but turned to acting instead.

Film career
Her Bollywood debut was with the 2003 film Qayamat: City Under Threat, which had an average performance at the box office. She rose to fame with her title role in Julie and then appeared in Sheesha (2005) in a dual role of twin sisters, but it did not do well at the box office. Dhupia then starred in films such as Kyaa Kool Hai Hum (2005) and Shootout at Lokhandwala (2007), which did well at the box office and featured in a segment of the anthology film Dus Kahaniyaan (2007).

In the following years, Dhupia appeared in supporting roles in multiple films including Chup Chup Ke (2006), Ek Chalis Ki Last Local (2007), Mithya (2008), Maharathi (2008), and Singh Is Kinng (2008) and Dasvidaniya (2008). In 2011, she played Eva Braun in the film Dear Friend Hitler about Mahatma Gandhi.

Other
Dhupia has modeled on the runway for designers such as Rohit Bal and D'damas.
In 2016, Dhupia conceptualized and hosted a Bollywood podcast called #NoFilterNeha on the Indian music app Saavn, in which she interviews Bollywood celebrities. The show received positive reviews, with over 2.3 million listeners. Dhupia debuted season four in November 2019 and planned to expand the podcast into a web series.

Personal life and off-screen work

Dhupia has run in the Mumbai Marathon to support the Concern India Foundation and helped to raise over 5 lakhs. She also helped to raise money for victims of the 2011 Sikkim earthquake. She performed at the GR8 Women's Award 2012. Dhupia is a vegetarian.

She participated in the Hiru Golden Film Awards 2014 in Sri Lanka as a special guest along with Bollywood actors such as Sunil Shetty, Vivek Oberoi, Anil Kapoor, and actress Bipasha Basu.

Dhupia married actor Angad Bedi, the son of former Indian cricket captain Bishan Singh Bedi in a private ceremony at a Gurudwara on 10 May 2018. On 18 November 2018, she gave birth to a girl named Mehr Dhupia Bedi. Dhupia was fat-shamed for her post-pregnancy weight gains by certain sections of the media in 2019. On 19 July 2021, she and Angad announced that they are expecting their second child with an Instagram post. She gave birth to her second child, a baby boy on 3 October 2021 and named him Guriq Singh Dhupia Bedi. She decided to leave MTV Roadies.

Filmography

Films

Television

See also
 List of Indian film actresses
 Femina Miss India

References

External links

1980 births
Living people
Actresses from Kochi
Female models from Kerala
Punjabi people
Indian Sikhs
Indian film actresses
Actresses in Hindi cinema
Actresses in Malayalam cinema
Actresses in Telugu cinema
Actresses in Urdu cinema
Actresses in Punjabi cinema
Indian television actresses
Actresses in Hindi television
Femina Miss India winners
Miss Universe 2002 contestants
Indian expatriate actresses in Pakistan
Delhi University alumni
20th-century Indian actresses
21st-century Indian actresses